The 2021 Parramatta Eels season was the 75th in the club's history. Coached by Brad Arthur and captained by Clinton Gutherson, they competed in the NRL's 2021 Telstra Premiership.

Summary
Similar to the 2020, Parramatta started the 2021 season in good form winning nine of the opening ten games. Towards the back end of the season however, Parramatta once again displayed inconsistent form and were hit with heavy losses against South Sydney and Manly. They also suffered an embarrassing 28-0 loss against an understrength Sydney Roosters side in round 20. In round 24, Parramatta produced the biggest upset of the season defeating Melbourne 22-10 who were on a 19-game winning streak. Parramatta would finish the regular season in sixth place. In the elimination final, they defeated Newcastle 28-20. The following week, they played Penrith in what would turn out to be the lowest scoring game of the season. Parramatta would lose the match in controversial circumstances 8-6.

Squad information
The playing squad and coaching staff of the Parramatta Eels for the 2021 NRL season.

Transfers

In:

Out:

Pre-season

Home and away season

League table

Matches

Notes:
aFor rounds 16 and 21, matches were played behind closed doors due to the COVID-19 pandemic.

Finals series

Bracket

Matches

References 

Parramatta Eels seasons
Parramatta Eels season
2021 NRL Women's season